Harold Cooper Pretty (23 October 1875 – 30 May 1952) was an English cricketer who played for Surrey and Northamptonshire County Cricket Clubs. He was born in Fressingfield, Suffolk and died at Kettering, Northamptonshire, where he was a medical practitioner. 

Pretty appeared in sixteen first-class matches as a right-handed batsman who bowled occasional off spin. He played eight times for Surrey in 1899, starting his career with an innings of 124 against Nottinghamshire when he opened the batting alongside Bobby Abel; Wisden Cricketers' Almanack termed it "a masterly innings". He surpassed that innings in his second match for Northamptonshire in 1906, when he made exactly 200 in 200 minutes with 35 fours against Derbyshire: Wisden commented that he took "any number of risks" but gave only two real chances, and that he made the rest of the batting in the match appear "quite commonplace".

Notes

1875 births
1952 deaths
English cricketers
Northamptonshire cricketers
Surrey cricketers
People from Fressingfield